The Minneapolis Grain Exchange (MGEX) is a commodities and futures exchange of grain products. It was formed in 1881 in Minneapolis, Minnesota, United States as a regional cash marketplace to promote fair trade and to prevent trade abuses in wheat, oats and corn. MGEX became a subsidiary of Miami International Holdings after the two companies merged in 2020.

MGEX has been the principal market for Hard Red Spring Wheat (HRSW) since 1881, offering futures and options contracts based on its unique commodity. HRSW is one of the highest-protein wheats. It is found in bagels, pizzas, high-quality breads and cereals, and some noodles and cookies. It is planted mostly in the U.S. Northern Plains and the Canadian Prairies.

Operations
MGEX offers five financially settled agricultural index products: Hard Red Spring Wheat Index (HRSI), Hard Red Winter Wheat Index (HRWI), Soft Red Winter Wheat Index (SRWI), National Corn Index (NCI) and National Soybean Index (NSI).

In an agreement with Data Transmission Network (now Telvent DTN), a business-to-business electronic commerce and information services company in Omaha, Nebraska, MGEX has exclusive rights to DTNs agriculture and weather data bases, which the exchange uses to develop index products.

Futures are traded exclusively electronically on the CME Globex platform. Options are traded side-by-side.

History
 Founded as the Minneapolis Chamber of Commerce in 1881, the MGEX has been a marketplace for producers, processors and millers for more than 125 years. The three Grain Exchange buildings in downtown Minneapolis are now listed on the National Register of Historic Places.

In 1883, the Chamber of Commerce introduced its first futures contract: hard red spring wheat. By 1946 "Chamber of Commerce" had become synonymous with organizations devoted mainly to civic and social issues. In 1947, the exchange was renamed the Minneapolis Grain Exchange. Today the exchange is most recognized by its logo and uses MGEX as first reference.

On December 19, 2008, the Minneapolis Grain Exchange ceased operations of the open outcry trading floor, but continues daily operations for the electronic trading platform. Today, HRSW futures trade exclusively electronically and options trade side-by-side.

Ownership 
In 2022, MGEX was owned by Miami International Holdings.

See also

MF Global

Notes

Further reading

External links

Minneapolis Grain Exchange
Minneapolis Grain Exchange Historical Video
MGEX Data Warehouse and Globex Audit Trail Parser distribution site.

Financial services companies established in 1881
Art Nouveau architecture in Minnesota
Art Nouveau commercial buildings
Commercial buildings completed in 1900
Commercial buildings on the National Register of Historic Places in Minnesota
Commodity exchanges in the United States
Futures exchanges
Grain trade
National Register of Historic Places in Minneapolis